James William Joseph Morefield (born January 10, 1984) is an American politician of the Republican Party.

Political career

On November 3, 2009, Will Morefield defeated Democratic incumbent Dan Bowling in the race for Virginia's 3rd District in the Virginia House of Delegates. Morefield's election was considered the beginning of Southwest Virginia's shift from being an ancestral Democratic voting area to a solidly Republican voting area.

In the 2016 election cycle Morefield endorsed former Florida Governor Jeb Bush for president, but later switched his endorsement for U.S. Senator for Florida Marco Rubio. After Donald Trump secured the Republican nomination for President in 2016, Morefield endorsed and supported Trump.

Electoral history

Notes

References
Will Morefield for the 3rd District
http://www2.tricities.com/tri/news/local/article/tazewell_man_25_is_gop_delegate_candidate/24449/
Obama backers face struggle in Appalachia
http://www2.tricities.com/tri/news/local/article/morefield_upsets_bowling_to_take_3rd_district_seat/35200/

1984 births
Living people
People from Tazewell, Virginia
Republican Party members of the Virginia House of Delegates
Midwestern State University alumni
People from Bluefield, West Virginia
21st-century American politicians